Prince William of Denmark and Norway or Prince Vilhelm (21 February 1687 – 23 November 1705) was the youngest son of Christian V of Denmark and Charlotte Amalie of Hesse-Kassel, and thus a younger brother of Frederick IV.

In 1696, Joachim Pritzbuer, who was replaced in 1705 by Martin Balthasar von Waldersee, was appointed Vilhelm's chamberlain. The latter was to accompany the prince on his great voyage abroad to Utrecht, the Spanish Netherlands, France, Italy and England. The instructions for Waldersee and the prince's secretary and teacher Johan Ernst Carlowitz are dated October 2, but soon after, Vilhelm fell ill and died on November 23 at Copenhagen Castle.

Ancestry

References

House of Oldenburg in Denmark
Danish princes
1687 births
1705 deaths
Burials at Roskilde Cathedral
Sons of kings